The New Gidget is an American sitcom sequel to the original 1965–66 sitcom Gidget. It aired in syndication from September 15, 1986, to May 12, 1988. The series was produced by original Gidget series producer Harry Ackerman and was launched after the made-for-television film Gidget's Summer Reunion, starring Caryn Richman as Gidget, aired in 1985.

Plot
The series features Gidget, who is in her late 20s and married to her idol, "Moondoggie" (Dean Butler). The couple live in Santa Monica, California, where Moondoggie works as an architect and Gidget runs the "Gidget Travel Agency" with her long-time best friend, Larue (Jill Jacobson).

Cast

Main
Caryn Richman as Francine "Gidget" Lawrence Griffin
Dean Butler as Jeff "Moondoggie" Griffin
Sydney Penny as Danielle "Dani" Collins
Lili Haydn as Gayle Baker
William Schallert as Russell "Russ" Lawrence
Don Stroud as The Great Kahuna
Jill Jacobson as Larue Wilson
Richard Paul as Wilton Parmenter
David Preston as Murph the Surf

Notable guest stars
 Judith Barsi
 Nina Blackwood
 Bob Denver
 Elinor Donahue
 Alice Ghostley
 Alan Hale
 Jan and Dean
 Patricia Morison
 The Safaris
 Timothy Stack
 Frank Stallone
 Jesse White
 Wolfman Jack

Episodes

Season 1 (1986–87)

Season 2 (1987–88)

Stations

References

External links
 

1986 American television series debuts
1988 American television series endings
1980s American sitcoms
English-language television shows
First-run syndicated television programs in the United States
Gidget
American sequel television series
Television series by Fremantle (company)
Television series by Sony Pictures Television
Television shows set in Santa Monica, California